Nihan Yeldan Güneyligil (born February 7, 1982, in İstanbul) is a Turkish volleyball player. She is 172 cm and plays as libero. She plays for Galatasaray Daikin.

Career
She signed 3 years contract with Fenerbahçe in June 2009. She also played for VakıfBank. She won Turkish League, Cup and Super Cup championship with Fenerbahçe in 2009–10 season.

Nihan won the gold, silver and bronze medal at the Women's CEV Champions League with Fenerbahçe Universal.

Güneyligil played with Fenerbahçe in the 2012 FIVB Club World Championship held in Doha, Qatar and helped her team to win the bronze medal after defeating Puerto Rico's Lancheras de Cataño 3–0.

Clubs
 VakıfBank (1992–1999)
 Bursaspor (1999–2001)
 Beşiktaş Istanbul (2001–2006)
 Vakıfbank (2006–2009)
 Fenerbahçe (2009–2011)
 Fenerbahçe (2011–2012)
 Fenerbahçe (2012–2013)
 Galatasaray Daikin (2013–2017)

Awards

Clubs
 2003-04 CEV Cup -  Champion, with VakıfBank
 2009-10 Aroma Women's Volleyball League -  Champion, with Fenerbahçe
 2009-10 Turkish Cup -  Runner-up, with Fenerbahçe
 2010 Turkish Super Cup -  Champion, with Fenerbahçe
 2009-10 CEV Champions League -  Runner-up, with Fenerbahçe
 2010 FIVB World Club Championship -  Champion, with Fenerbahçe
 2010-11 CEV Champions League -  Bronze medal, with Fenerbahçe
 2010-11 Aroma Women's Volleyball League -  Champion, with Fenerbahçe
 2011-12 CEV Champions League -  Champion, with Fenerbahçe
 2012 FIVB Women's Club World Championship –  Bronze Medal, with Fenerbahçe
 2012-13 CEV Cup -  Runner-up, with Fenerbahçe

See also
 Turkish women in sports

References

External links
 Player profile at fenerbahce.org

1982 births
Living people
Volleyball players from Istanbul
Turkish women's volleyball players
Galatasaray S.K. (women's volleyball) players
VakıfBank S.K. volleyballers
Mediterranean Games medalists in volleyball
Mediterranean Games silver medalists for Turkey
Competitors at the 2009 Mediterranean Games
21st-century Turkish women